Alumni of the Government College University, Lahore (GCU), including alumni of its predecessor Government College, Lahore, are called Ravians. Following is the list of notable Ravians.

Nobel Laureates
 
 Dr. Har Gobind Khorana - Nobel Prize in Medicine;
 Dr. Abdus Salam - Nobel Laureate in theoretical physics; astrophysicist

Scholars
 Muhammad Iqbal – Poet, philosopher, politician, lawyer, architect of the idea of Pakistan
 Mirza Athar Baig – Novelist, playwright and philosopher
 Muhammad Ajmal – Founder of psychology in Pakistan, former Principal of Government College and Vice Chancellor of the University of the Punjab
 Javed Ashraf – Economist, academician and Vice Chancellor of Quaid-e-Azam University
 Tariq Jameel – Islamic Scholar and Preacher
 Javed Ahmad Ghamidi – Islamic Modernist Scholar
 Malik Ram – Urdu, Arabic, and Persian Scholar and Writer
 Ismat Beg – Mathematician and academician. Known for his work in fixed point theory and multicriteria decision-making problems.
 Arfa Sayeda Zehra – Pakistani educationist and Urdu language expert
 Asghar Zaidi – Current Vice Chancellor of Government College University (GCU)
 Khalid Manzoor Butt – Pakistani Political Science Scholar & Chairperson of Political Science Department GCU Lahore.
 Sarvadaman Chowla – Indian-American mathematician
 Abdul Hafeez Mirza - Pakistani writer, educationist, tourism worker and cultural activist.
 Amir Asif - Professor Electrical Engineering and Computer Science, Vice President Research and Innovation, York University, Toronto, Canada.

Writers
Vasay Chaudhry – Film, Drama writer, Actor
 Mustansar Hussain Tarar writer, poet, storyteller, and intellectual.
 Ashfaq Ahmed – Urdu writer, playwright, broadcaster and intellectual
 Mirza Athar Baig – novelist, playwright, philosopher, and short story writer
 Patras Bokhari – Urdu writer; first Permanent Representative of Pakistan to the United Nations (1951–54); former Under-Secretary General of United
 Bano Qudsia – novelist
 Qudrat Ullah Shahab – Urdu writer and civil servant
Wasif Ali Wasif Poet and Intellectual
 Khushwant Singh - Indian Novelist and Barrister

Politicians
 Muhammad Zafarullah Khan – first Foreign Minister of Pakistan; former President of United Nations General Assembly; former President of International Court of Justice
 Chaudhry Naseer Ahmad Malhi - A close aide of Muhammad Ali Jinnah and one of Pakistan's founding fathers. Former Minister of Education, Law & Parliamentary Affairs
 Nawaz Sharif - Ex Prime Minister of Pakistan
 Mir Zafarullah Khan Jamali - former Prime Minister of Pakistan
 Yousaf Raza Gillani - former Prime Minister of Pakistan and speaker
 Moeen Qureshi – former interim Prime Minister of Pakistan
 Swaran Singh, the longest-serving Indian federal minister
 Aitzaz Ahsan – barrister; Former Federal Minister of Interior, Law & Justice; President of Supreme Court Bar Association of Pakistan
 Aseff Ahmad Ali – Former Minister of Foreign Affairs and current Deputy Chairman Planning Commission
 Dr. Ghulam Hussain – former Federal Minister for Railways and Secretary-General of Pakistan People's Party
 Khurshid Mahmood Kasuri – former Minister of Foreign Affairs
 Hanif Ramay – intellectual, journalist; former Governor and Chief Minister of Punjab
Shehbaz Sharif -Current Prime Minister, former Chief Minister of Punjab, Pakistan

Government officials
 Malik Zahoor Ahmad – diplomat, Middle East/South Asia expert, political analyst
 Mirza Muzaffar Ahmad – former Secretary of Commerce and Finance; Deputy Director Planning Commission of Pakistan; former Finance Minister Pakistan
 Musa Javed Chohan – diplomat, former ambassador to France, Malaysia
 Javid Husain - diplomat, former ambassador of Pakistan to Iran, South Korea, and the Netherlands
 Abdus Salim Khan - senior Pakistani diplomat and former ambassador of Pakistan to Ceylon (now Sri Lanka), Japan and Deputy High Commissioner to the United Kingdom.
 Kershasp Tehmurasp Satarawala - diplomat, former Indian Ambassador to Mexico, Guatemala, and El Salvador
 S M Zafar – Lawyer, Senator, and former Law Minister

Armed Forces officers
 Lieutenant General Hamid Gul – retired, Pakistani Army
 General Shamim Alam Khan, NI(M), SJ, SBt
 General Raheel Sharif - former Chief of Army Staff
 Air Chief Marshal Mushaf Ali Mir - Former Chief of Air Staff
 Major Shabbir Sharif, NH, SJ - Recipient of sword of honour and only person to receive both Sitara-e-Jurrat & Nishan-e-Haider

Nuclear scientists
 Dr. Ishfaq Ahmad - nuclear physicist; chairman of PAEC, 1991-2001
 Dr. Mujaddid Ahmad Ijaz - researcher in theoretical physics with PAEC; his son Mansoor Ijaz was involved in the memogate controversy
 Munir Ahmad Khan - Chairman of PAEC, 1972–1991; IAEA staff member, 1958–72; Chairman of IAEA Board of Governors, 1986–87
 Dr. Samar Mubarakmand - experimental nuclear physicist and missile engineer

Actors
 Dev Anand – Indian actor
Balraj Sahni
 Ahsan Khan
Usman Peerzada

Poets
 Dr.Muhammad Iqbal – Pakistan's national poet
Noon Meem Rashid - poet
 Faiz Ahmed Faiz - one of Pakistan's leading Marxist's who won the Lenin Peace Prize

Journalists
Aftab Iqbal-Investigative Journalist, Infotainment Comedy Anchor
Amir Mir - investigative journalist
 Hamid Mir – journalist, political analyst and TV anchor
 Ahmed Rashid – UK-based journalist, analyst and writer
 Mansoor Ali Khan - Anchorperson To the Point
Mubashir Lucman - Film Director turned journalist
 Najam Sethi - News Analyst
 Iqrar Ul Hassan - Hosts Sar e Aam at ARY NEWS

Judiciary & lawyers
 Muhammad Javed Buttar - former Justice, Supreme Court of Pakistan
 Javid Iqbal – scholar; former Chief Justice of the Lahore High Court; Judge of Supreme Court; son of Dr. Sir Muhammad Iqbal
 M. R. Kayani – former Chief Justice of Lahore High Court
 Justice Asif Saeed Khosa, judge Supreme Court of Pakistan 
 Makhdoom Ali Khan - Barrister, former Attorney General of Pakistan
 Nasim Hasan Shah - former Chief Justice, Supreme Court of Pakistan
 Mian Saqib Nisar - Chief Justice, Supreme Court of Pakistan
 Asif Saeed Khan Khosa - Chief Justice, Supreme Court of Pakistan.

Musicians
 Shafqat Amanat Ali Khan – singer
 Mustafa Zahid - pop singer and vocalist of the band Roxen
 Hadiqa Kiani - singer
 Ali Zafar - pop singer
 Waris Baig – singer

Athletes
Rameez Raja - cricketer, who represented Pakistan in 1990s, commentator in international cricket matches

People from film industry 

 Chetan Anand – producer and director from India; elder brother of Dev and Vijay Anand

Businessmen / Entrepreneurs
 Prakash Tandon – Indian businessman

References 

Lists of people by university or college in Pakistan